College Street Historic District may refer to:

 College Street Historic District (Troy, Alabama), listed on the NRHP in Alabama
 College Street Historic District (Harrodsburg, Kentucky), listed on the NRHP in Kentucky
 College Street Historic District (Pikeville, Kentucky), listed on the NRHP in Kentucky
 College Street Historic District (Senatobia, Mississippi), listed on the NRHP in Mississippi
 College Street Historic District (Clinton, North Carolina), listed on the NRHP in North Carolina
 College Street Historic District (Newberry, South Carolina), listed on the NRHP in South Carolina